Frensham Heights School is an independent school and sixth form college located near Farnham, Surrey, England, run by the registered charity, Frensham Heights Educational Trust Ltd. It was founded in 1925 and formed as part of the movement for progressive education. Unlike many HMC member schools, it has been coeducational and took both day and boarding pupils since its foundation.

Foundation and location
The school was founded by Edith Douglas-Hamilton and established under joint headmistresses, Beatrice Ensor and Isabel King. It became firmly established under the headmastership of Paul Roberts (1928–1949) and was recognised as efficient by the Ministry of Education in 1935.

Based at a mock-Tudor mansion, built by the brewer Charles Charrington in 1902, and in its estate, the school is on a hill  from the centre of Farnham but is actually in the village of Frensham. Its grounds run into Rowledge.

The headmaster
The current head is Rick Clarke, who replaced the previous head, Andrew Fisher, in 2019. Prior to becoming headmaster of Frensham Heights, Clarke was deputy head at Warminster.

Facilities
The school now has a fully functioning music centre including the Sixth Form Centre. The Aldridge Theatre is the Frensham venue for drama activities, with external theatre companies sometimes performing there. The school also has a Photography Suite, Sports Hall, Dance Studio and 'Outdoor Education' facilities. It also has a sixth form centre for both day and boarding students, it is slightly separated from the rest of the school in order for the school to compete with other colleges.

Sport

Despite being a somewhat small school, Frensham Heights hosts several sports teams in various fields of sport and played at all age ranges. These include common sports such as Rugby, football, hockey, basketball, netball and cricket. Taking part in sport each week is compulsory until year 13 when students can opt to use the time usually allocated to sport for extra revision and study, although this is only allowed if a student attends a sport ECA. Although not being renowned for its sport, the under 16 boys' football team has reached the quarter final of the ISFA cup, a national trophy for small independent schools.

Between year 7 and year 11, there are two sessions of sport each week, while only one for the sixth form. From year 9 upwards, students can choose which sport to do each term with options being archery, football, badminton, hockey and golf, as well as swimming, tennis and rounders during the summer. Prior to year 9, students partake in sports including rugby, basketball, hockey and football and athletics, rounders and swimming in the summer term but have no choice over which activity occurs at any point.

Outdoor education
As a subsidiary to sport, outdoor education (or simply 'outdoor-ed') is compulsory for all students between year 7 and year 11. Different from sport in that it does not stress athletic qualities, instead it encourages teamwork, co-operation, individual courage and leadership, ideals which reflect the school's ethos.

Outdoor ed typically involves team-building activities in the woods including activities such as climbing 'Jacob's Ladder' and a high ropes challenge near the Sports Hall. The school runs regular Outdoor Education trips to places such as a climbing trip to Dartmoor and to Harrison's Rocks in Kent. The school also runs the Duke of Edinburgh award at all levels.

The school has recently introduced weekly Forest Schools sessions for all pupils in the First School; Nursery to Year Three.

Notable alumni

Ex-pupils (Old Frenshamians) include:
Kay Alexander, journalist and television presenter
Myrtle Allen, Michelin star winning head chef and co-owner of the restaurant The Yeats Room of Ballymaloe House in Shanagarry, County Cork.
Nikki Amuka-Bird, actress
David Berglas, Pre-eminent psychological illusionist, President of The Magic Circle (1989–1998).
Hugo Blick, writer, producer, director, and occasional actor
Edward Davenport, fraudster
Jack Dee, comedian
Mark Frankel, actor
Clive Gillinson, director, Carnegie Hall
Jamie Glover, actor
Domino Harvey, bounty hunter
Wolfgang Hildesheimer, author and painter
Will Hodgkinson, writer
Charlotte Hough (née Woodyadd), author and illustrator
Richard Hough, author and historian
Rufus Hound, comedian
James Irvine, designer
Tony Knowland, professor
Sir Thomas Legg, civil servant
Nick Mason, drummer, Pink Floyd
Tobias Menzies, actor
Crispin Mills, musician
Hattie Morahan, actress
Lord Claus Moser, came to the school as a refugee from Germany
Carl Ng, actor
Rex Orange County, musician
Bill Pertwee, actor, best known for his role as the greengrocer and warden Mr. Hodges in Dad's Army and cousin to Jon Pertwee
Jon Pertwee, actor who played the third Doctor in Doctor Who
Wolf Rilla, film director
Sam Roddick, businesswoman
Su Rogers, architect
Valerie Singleton, television presenter
Henry Smith, Member of Parliament for Crawley (2010–)
Jim Sturgess, actor
Ryan Wilson, Scottish international rugby union player
Louis Klamroth, television presenter and journalist

References

External links
School Website
Profile on the ISC website

Boarding schools in Surrey
Private schools in Surrey
Educational institutions established in 1925
Member schools of the Headmasters' and Headmistresses' Conference
 
1925 establishments in England
Sixth form colleges in Surrey